HMS Crested Eagle was a paddle steamer sunk in the Dunkirk evacuation. J. Samuel White built her in 1925 for the General Steam Navigation Company, and was requisitioned by the Admiralty during the World War II for anti-aircraft duties as part of the Thames Special Service Flotilla.

History
Crested Eagle was the first oil-burning paddle steamer built for the Thames. She carried passengers from Old Swan Pier (just west of London Bridge), along the Thames to Margate. In 1932 General Steam Navigation Company  assigned Crested Eagle to new routes from London to Clacton-on-Sea and Felixstowe, while the newly launched  took over the old Margate route. With the outbreak of World War II, in September 1939, Crested Eagle was one of the ships tasked with evacuating children out of London, carrying them to Felixstowe.

On 29 May 1940, captained by Lieutenant Commander (Temporary) Bernard Booth RNR, Crested Eagle sailed from Sheerness to the east mole at Dunkirk. Troops were boarding the trawlers and the three ships in between bombing raids. But after Grenade and Fenella were both damaged by bombing raids, the survivors on both ships disembarked and boarded the Crested Eagle. She set sail with about 600 men aboard, but less than a mile from the mole a number of bombs hit her. With the aft of the ship on fire, including the lounges where large numbers of troops had been sheltering, the captain was advised by an engineer that the ship would not survive, so he ordered the ship beached. About 300 soldiers were killed in the incident.

The ship is now still visible at low spring tide on Zuydcoote beach.

References

1925 ships
Little Ships of Dunkirk
Paddle steamers of the United Kingdom
Passenger ships of the United Kingdom
Ships sunk by German aircraft
World War II shipwrecks in the North Sea